William Livingston (1723–1790) was Governor of New Jersey.

Wiliam Livingston may also refer to:

William Livingston (British politician) (fl. 1650–1713), member of parliament for Aberdeen Burghs
William Livingston (poet) (1808–1870), Gaelic poet, known for the poem Uilleam Mac Dhun Lèibhe
William S. Livingston (1920–2013), political science professor
William E. Livingston (1832–1919), Massachusetts politician
William Livingston, 3rd Viscount of Kilsyth, involved in Acts of Union 1707
William Livingston, 4th Lord Livingston (fl. 1502–1518), Scottish nobleman
William Livingston, 4th Lord Livingston of Callendar, see Alexander Livingston, 5th Lord Livingston
William Livingston (Washington County, NY) in 27th New York State Legislature
William Livingston (athlete), see Brian Johnson (long jumper)

See also
William Livingstone (disambiguation)